Associazione Sportiva Dilettantistica Sevegliano, or simply Sevegliano, is an Italian association football club located in Sevegliano, a village in the municipality of Bagnaria Arsa, Friuli-Venezia Giulia. It currently plays in Promozione Friuli-Venezia Giulia.

In 2016 it merged with A.S.D. Atletico Fauglis to form A.S.D. Sevegliano Fauglis.

History
Unione Sportiva Sevegliano (it will become A.S.D. in 2004/05 for fiscal reasons) was officially born on 28th June 1945 by a group of sports enthusiasts. At the beginning it has three sections: tennis, athletics and football. These were the pioneering years of regional amateur football and the "canaries" play in Promozione, disputing various season in the Isonzo group, where high-ranking teams such as Monfalcone and Pro Gorizia ruled.
The team experiences alternating seasons, but in 1958–59, the formation led by captain Francesco Vidal, who counted in his ranks Maurizio Zamparini (current owner and president of Palermo F.C.), Carlo Tirelli, Renato Sclauzero and Sergio Peressutti, won the Juniores title and disputes the regional final against U.S. Triestina. In the 1979–80 season comes the first success of regional importance: in the final played in San Canzian d'Isonzo, Sevegliano beat Rosandra (a club from Trieste) and captain Flavio Virginio can raise the Region Cup "M.G. Devetti". In the 1983–84 season, Maurizio Zamparini, one of the "Juniores '58", combines the "Mercatone Zeta" brand with the village association and inaugurates the first of many seasons of great yellow and blue success.
For six seasons, U.S. Sevegliano is the representative society of the smallest inhabited center of Interregionale. Attilio Tesser, in his debut on the bench, should be mentioned among the coaches of the period. Then the club must return to Eccellenza and subsequently to Promozione. There is another trophy on the bulletin board: on 6th January 2008, Sevegliano, led by Maurizio Trombetta, beats A.S.D. Manzanese on penalties and captain Giancarlo Conchione raises the Coppa Italia Dilettanti FVG.

Maurizio Trombetta, in the 2007–08 season was at the helm of A.S.D. Sevegliano in Eccellenza (7th Italian division). In the 2008–09 season he found himself at the helm of CFR Cluj in the 2008–09 UEFA Champions League.

In 2012 A.S.D. Atletico was born in Fauglis, a small village in the municipality of Gonars. The social colors are black and white and the team easily climbs from Terza Categoria to Prima Categoria.

In the summer of 2016, ASD Sevegliano finds itself with a weak team and has just been relegated from Promozione, while ASD Atletico has no stadium, in fact it plays home games in Palmanova; for this reason it seems natural a fusion between these two clubs: the yellow & blue put the sports facilities and the youth sector while the white & black put the players of the first team. Thus was born ASD Sevegliano Fauglis and the colors are white and blue.

Recent seasons

Key

Honours
Eccellenza Friuli-Venezia Giulia (1st regional level)
Winners: 1989–90, 1999–00

Promozione Friuli-Venezia Giulia (2nd regional level)
Winners: 1987–88

Prima Categoria Friuli-Venezia Giulia (3rd regional level)
Winners: 2018–19

Coppa Italia Dilettanti Friuli-Venezia Giulia
Winners: 2007–08

Supercup Friuli-Venezia Giulia
Winners: 2000

Colors and badge 
ASD Sevegliano colors were yellow and blue, while new club ones are white and blue.

References

External links
Sevegliano Fauglis page @ friuligol.it
Sevegliano Fauglis page @ tuttocampo.it
Sevegliano Fauglis page @ facebook.com

Sevegliano
Sevegliano
Sevegliano
A.S.D. Sevegliano